Ferhad Pasha Sokolović (died 1586) was an Ottoman general and statesman from Bosnia. He was the last sanjak-bey of Bosnia and first beylerbey of Bosnia.

Origin
Born into the Sokolović family, he was, like his close relative Grand Vizier Sokollu Mehmed Pasha (Mehmed-paša Sokolović) abducted as part of the devşirme system of collection of Christian boys to be raised to serve in the janissary corps, Islamized and recruited into Ottoman service. While one part of the family became Islamized, the other stayed Christian; notably, another relative (possibly Mehmed's brother), Makarije Sokolović, was appointed as a Serbian Patriarch by Mehmed Pasha, who with the support of the Sultan had revived the Patriarchate of Peć.

Sanjakbey of Klis
Ferhad Pasha was governor of the Sanjak of Klis between 1566 and 1574. Nothing much is known during his rule in Klis.

Sanjakbey of Bosnia

Then he moved back to Bosnia, and was one of the founding fathers of Banja Luka, the second largest city in modern Bosnia and Herzegovina. There, he built over 200 buildings ranging from artisan and sales shops to wheat warehouses, baths and mosques. Among more important commissions were the Ferhadija and Arnaudija mosques during which construction a plumbing infrastructure was laid that served surrounding residential areas. He moved the seat of Bosnia from Travnik to Banja Luka.

In 1576–77, he conquered the towns of Mutnica, Ostrožac, Podzvizd, Kladuša, Peći, and other towns to the Kupa. Already by springtime 1577, he settled Serb families from Serbia to Bosnia around reconstructed towns in those areas to boost the population.

Ferhad reformed Bosnia and made Banja Luka its capital for a couple of decades then it was returned to Sarajevo.

Beylerbey of Bosnia
In 1580 Ferhad reformed Bosnia from a Rumelian Sanjak to its own Eyalet, he became the first governor of the newly formed Bosnia Eyalet, as beylerbey (also referred to as "pasha") which ceded from the Rumelia Eyalet as its own province. The Bosnia Eyalet (or Pashaluk) comprised a total of ten sanjaks: Sanjak of Bosnia (central province), Sanjak of Herzegovina, Sanjak of Vučitrn, Sanjak of Prizren, Sanjak of Klis, Sanjak of Krka, Sanjak of Pojega and Sanjak of Pakrac. The sanjakbey of the Sanjak of Pakrac was Ali-beg, brother of Ferhad Pasha Sokolović.

Siege of Gvozdansko
Ferhad Pasha Sokolović with 10,000 soldiers organized three major assaults and tried to take Gvozdansko Castle in the Kingdom of Croatia in the Habsburg monarchy. Finally, when the Ottomans entered the castle gates, all the defending forces were already dead of wounds, hunger and cold. The Siege of Gvozdansko ended with an Ottoman victory on 13 January 1578. Ferhad Pasha was so moved by their bravery that they were conceded a Christian burial and the local population freed from taxes.

Death
Ferhad died in Buda (Budapest) in the year 1586, he requested when he died that his body must be moved to Banja Luka the city he himself built from the ground. He was probably buried near his Ferhadija mosque in Banja Luka.

Annotations

See also

Mehmed Pasha Sokolović
Mustafa Pasha Sokolović

References

Ottoman governors of Bosnia
Ottoman Bosnian nobility
Bosnia and Herzegovina generals
1586 deaths
Year of birth unknown
Devshirme
Converts to Islam from Eastern Orthodoxy
Former Serbian Orthodox Christians
1530 births